Panukulan, officially the Municipality of Panukulan,  is a 4th class municipality in the province of Quezon, Philippines. According to the 2020 census, it has a population of 16,376 people. It is located in the northwestern part of the island of Polillo in the Polillo Islands.

Geography
The establishment of the municipality of Panukulan begun with the separation of barangays Panukulan, Calasumanga, Libo and Lipata from its former unit the municipality of Polillo, for incorporation into the new municipality of Panukulan by virtue of the passage of Republic Act No. 2452 on June 21, 1959.

The municipality is located at the northern tip of Polillo Island which is 26 nautical miles from Infanta Quezon. It is geographically situated at 121°48.50′ longitude and 14°56′ latitude. It is bounded in the north by the Philippine Sea (Pacific Ocean), on the east by the municipality of Burdeos, Quezon, on the south by Polillo, Quezon, and on the west by Polillo Strait. Infanta, Quezon is its nearest commercial center. Its travel time by motor boat going to Infanta and vice- versa is about 1.5 hours to 2 hours, depending on the weather condition. Only single regular trip is available, which leave Municipal Port at 7:30 AM and return from Infanta at 2:00 PM. All its barangay are accessible through banca or motorboat. Only Barangay Balungay up to the boundary of Barangay Pag-itan can be reached through land transportation. However, there are also Tricycle Operator at Barangay Libo to Kinalagti, Barangay Libo to Pandan and Barangay Calasumanga is now also connected with the municipality of Polillo through Tricycle.

Barangays
Panukulan is politically subdivided into 13 barangays.

 Balungay
 Bato
 Bonbon
 Calasumanga
 Kinalagti
 Libo
 Lipata
 Matangkap
 Milawid
 Pagitan
 Pandan
 Rizal
 San Juan (Poblacion)

Climate

Demographics

Economy

Government

Elected officials
Municipal council:

See also
Polillo Islands

References

External links
 Panukulan Profile at PhilAtlas.com
 https://web.archive.org/web/20120701062625/http://www.quezon.gov.ph/about/panukulan.html
 [ Philippine Standard Geographic Code]
 Philippine Census Information
 Local Governance Performance Management System
 www.chanrobles.com

Municipalities of Quezon